Zard-Kuh  (meaning "Yellow Mountain", also spelled Zardkuh, Zarduh Kuh or Zard Kuh-e Bakhtiari; Persian:  زردکوه بختیاری) is a sub-range in the central Zagros Range, Iran.

With an elevation of 4221 metres, the Zard-Kuh is located in the Zagros Mountains in the Chaharmahal and Bakhtiari Province of Iran. The Karun and also Zayanderud rivers start in the Zagros mountains near the Zard-Kuh. There are small glaciers on the mountain owing to the relatively high precipitation, which are the only glaciers in the subtropics outside the Himalayas, Andes and Trans-Mexican Volcanic Belt.

Geologically, the Zard-Kuh is situated in the Sanandaj-Sirjan geologic and structural zone of Iran and is mainly made of Cretaceous limestone.

The famous early documentary Grass captures on film the Bakhtiari tribe's crossing of Zard-Kuh barefoot in the snow with 50,000 people and 125,000 animals.

See also 
 List of Ultras of West Asia

References

External links
 peakbagger.com

Mountain ranges of Iran
Zagros Mountains
Landforms of Chaharmahal and Bakhtiari Province
Four-thousanders of the Zagros